Kosmos 1001 ( meaning Cosmos 1001) was a redesigned Soviet Soyuz T spacecraft that was flown on an unmanned test in 1978.  The spacecraft was the upgraded Soyuz for Salyut-6 and Salyut-7. This Kosmos flight, launched from Baikonur, was the first orbital tests of the Soyuz T design. Several maneuvers were tested.

Mission parameters

Spacecraft: Soyuz-7K-ST.
Orbit: 200 x 228km.
Inclination: 52 degrees.
Mass: 6680 kg.
Crew: None.
Launched: April 4, 1978.
Landed: April 15, 1978.

References

External links
Astronautix web page

Kosmos satellites
Spacecraft launched in 1978
1978 in spaceflight
1978 in the Soviet Union
Soyuz uncrewed test flights